Kristen Lange, (born June 18, 1988) is a professional squash player who represents the United States. She reached a career-high world ranking of World No. 51 in February 2013.

References

External links 

American female squash players
Penn Quakers women's squash players
Living people
1988 births
Sportspeople from Seattle
21st-century American women